Reuben F. Maury (1824 – 1906) was a colonel of the 1st Oregon Cavalry during the American Civil War, and the last commander of the District of Oregon in 1865.

Maury was a graduate of the United States Military Academy at West Point, where he and George E. Pickett were classmates.  He was a veteran of the Mexican War, and became an Oregon pioneer in 1852.  He was a major of the 1st Oregon Cavalry, eventually reaching the rank of colonel. He conducted operations in Oregon and the Idaho Territory and fought in the first part of the Snake War.  He was commander of the District of Oregon from March 23, 1865 to June 27, 1865.
He was a resident of Jackson County, Oregon, for many years, and died near Jacksonville, Oregon on February 20, 1906.

The Maury Mountains, in Crook County, Oregon, are named for him.

References 

1824 births
1906 deaths
Oregon pioneers
American military personnel of the Mexican–American War
United States Military Academy alumni
American people of the Indian Wars
People of Oregon in the American Civil War
People from Jackson County, Oregon
Snake War
Union Army colonels